Gordon E. Hill (February 10, 1927 – November 24, 2014) was an American quartet bass singer during the 1940s through the early 1960s.

Life and career 
Hill was born in Missouri on February 10, 1927. He sung with several quartets, including:
C.R. Melton's All American Quartet 
Bobby Strickland's Southlanders Quartet in Birmingham, Alabama 
The original bass singer for Hovie Lister's Statesmen Quartet in Atlanta, Georgia in 1948.

After leaving the Statesmen in 1949, he sang bass with several quartets including a return to the All American Quartet in Mount Vernon, Illinois and the Revelaires Quartet, headquartered in Atlanta, Georgia.

Hill died in Tucson, Arizona on November 24, 2014, at the age of 87.

References 
Specific

General
Goff, James R. (2002). Close Harmony: A History of Southern Gospel. Chapel Hill: University of North Carolina Press. Page 170. .
Terrell, Bob (1990). The Music Men:The Story of Professional Gospel Quartet Singing. Bob Terrell Publisher. Page 113.   
Cusic, Don (2002). The Sound Of Light: A History of Gospel and Christian Music. Hal Leonard Corporation Publisher. Page 193.

1927 births
2014 deaths
American basses
American gospel singers
Singers from Missouri